Burnfoot  is a small village within the townland of Bonnanaboigh in County Londonderry, Northern Ireland.

Features
It is beside the River Roe, with the greater part of the built up area on the western side of Drumrane Road. The village has a good range of social, educational and recreational facilities, but commercial services are limited.

It has quite a large village shop, football fields and a primary school plus Orange Hall. Burnfoot has two churches, Bovevagh Church of Ireland (St. Eugenius) and Camnish Presbyterian Church. The Church of Ireland are currently developing a new parish centre for the development of the parish. Burnfoot has its own community hall and youth clubs such as  the Girls Brigade. It has had a recent new housing development called Rosebrook which added at least 15 houses to the area, making the population now about 250.
In 2010 a man appeared in court charged with provocative behaviour after removing a loyalist flag from a lamppost in the area. The judge stated he should be commended for his actions.

Transport
The village has good road links via Dungiven, but has limited public transport connections.

Education
Drumrane Primary School ( An amalgamation of Dungiven PS Largy PS, and Burnfoot PS, which is situated beside the old Burnfoot Primary School in Burnfoot.

Sport
Burnfoot United F.C. football club, founded in 1975, plays in the Coleraine and District Junior Premier League.

See also
List of villages in Northern Ireland

References

Villages in County Londonderry
Causeway Coast and Glens district